Tierre Turner (born January 7, 1960) is an American actor and stuntperson who began his career as a child actor in the 1970s. His feature film debut was the horror film People Toys (1974), followed by the television drama film The Runaways (1975). Turner also had supporting roles in several blaxploitation films in the 1970s, including Bucktown and Friday Foster (1975), both starring Pam Grier. He also portrayed the lead role of Lucas Adams on the television series The Cop and the Kid opposite Charles Durning from 1975 to 1976.

Since the 1980s, Turner has worked extensively as a stunt performer and stunt coordinator on a variety of feature films, including Training Day (2001), Stuck on You (2003), and The Three Stooges (2012).

Biography
Turner was born January 7, 1960 in Detroit, Michigan.  His brother, Dain Turner, is also an actor and stuntperson. His first feature film role was as one of several murderous children in the slasher film People Toys (1974), also known as Devil Times Five. He subsequently had supporting roles in several blaxploitation films, including Bucktown and Friday Foster (1975), both starring Pam Grier. He also appeared in a supporting role as the friend of Laurence Fishburne's character in the drama Cornbread, Earl and Me (also 1975).

From 1975 to 1976, Turner starred opposite Charles Durning in the comedy series The Cop and the Kid.

Since the 1980s, Turner has worked as a stunt performer for numerous feature films, including Where's Marlowe? (1998), Training Day (2001), The Fighting Temptations (2003), Stuck on You (2003), and The Three Stooges (2012).

Select filmography

Film

Television

References

External links

1960 births
African-American male child actors
American male child actors
American stunt performers
Male actors from Detroit
Living people
21st-century African-American people
20th-century African-American people